Green Township is one of the fifteen townships of Ashland County, Ohio, United States. As of the 2010 census the population was 3,951.

Geography
Located in the southern part of the county, it borders the following townships:
Vermillion Township - north
Mohican Township - northeast corner
Lake Township - east
Washington Township, Holmes County - southeast
Hanover Township - south
Worthington Township, Richland County - southwest corner
Monroe Township, Richland County - west
Mifflin Township - northwest corner

Two villages are located in Green Township: part of Loudonville in the southeast, and Perrysville in the southwest.

Name and history
Green Township began as a part of Richland County in 1806. The name first appears in maps and records in the 1820s following settlement of the township about 1818. It was separated to become a part of Ashland County upon its formation in 1846. It is one of sixteen Green Townships statewide.

Government
The township is governed by a three-member board of trustees, who are elected in November of odd-numbered years to a four-year term beginning on the following January 1. Two are elected in the year after the presidential election and one is elected in the year before it. There is also an elected township fiscal officer, who serves a four-year term beginning on April 1 of the year after the election, which is held in November of the year before the presidential election. Vacancies in the fiscal officership or on the board of trustees are filled by the remaining trustees.

References

External links
Township website
County website

Townships in Ashland County, Ohio
1806 establishments in Ohio
Townships in Ohio